North Fork Hughes River is a  long 5th order tributary to Hughes River in Ritchie County, West Virginia.  This is the only stream of this name in the United States.

Course
North Fork Hughes River rises about 3 miles northwest of Mountain, West Virginia, and then flows southwesterly and joins the Hughes River about 4 miles southeast of Freeport.

Watershed
North Fork Hughes River drains  of area, receives about 44.8 in/year of precipitation, has a wetness index of 267.14, and is about 84% forested.

See also
List of rivers of West Virginia

References

Rivers of West Virginia
Rivers of Ritchie County, West Virginia